The 15 cm SK C/25 was a German medium-caliber naval gun used during the Second World War. It served as the primary armament for the Konigsberg and s. No surplus weapons of this type appear to have been used as coast-defense guns.

Description
This gun was the most powerful of the Kriegsmarine's  guns and was designed with a loose barrel, jacket and breech-piece with a vertical sliding breech block.

Mount 
The Drh. LC/25 triple-gun mount was the only mount used for this gun in the Kriegsmarine. Each mount was designed for full 360° of traverse, but was limited to much less than that by the ship's superstructure. The electrically powered hydraulic pumps had a maximum elevating speed of 8° per second, while train was a maximum of 6-8° per second. The maximum firing cycle was 7.5 seconds, or 8 rounds per minute, despite being hand-loaded and rammed. Ammunition was supplied by three hoists, one between the left and center guns and the other two between center and right guns at the rear of the mount.

Ammunition 
The SK C/25 had a number of different shells available.

Footnotes
Notes

Citations

References

External links

 SK C/25 on navweaps.com

World War II artillery of Germany
Naval guns of Germany
World War II naval weapons
150 mm artillery
Military equipment introduced in the 1920s